La Salette can refer to:

 La Salette, Ontario, a hamlet in Norfolk County, Ontario, Canada
 La Salette-Fallavaux, a commune in the Isère department, France
 La Salette, Isère, a village in the commune La Salette-Fallavaux
 Our Lady of La Salette, a pilgrimage location in La Salette, France
 Notre-Dame-de-la-Salette, Quebec, a village and municipality in Outaouais region, Quebec, Canada
 La Salette of Roxas, a private marian institution in Roxas, Isabela, Philippines.
 University of La Salette, a private Catholic university in Santiago City, Philippines.

de:La Salette
fr:Notre-Dame de la Salette
it:La Salette
nl:La Salette
pl:La Salette